Za sklom may refer to:
 Za sklom (song), song by Bratislava band Korben Dallas
 Za sklom (TV series), Slovak TV series